Léontine Lippmann (1844–1910), better known by her married name of Madame Arman or Madame Arman de Caillavet, was the muse of Anatole France and the hostess of a highly fashionable literary salon during the French Third Republic. Madame Verdurin in Proust's Remembrance of Things Past was modelled on Lippmann.

Life
Born into a wealthy Jewish family as a banker's daughter, she married Albert Arman.  Arman's mother's maiden name was Caillavet and so they called themselves Arman de Caillavet. They had one child, the playwright Gaston Arman de Caillavet.  Neither of them was faithful to the other, though they never divorced.

Beautiful in her youth, with clear blue eyes, black hair, and a mocking mouth, she was intelligent, cultivated and spoke four languages.  She often attended the salons of Lydie Aubernon and it was there that she met Anatole France, in 1883. From 1888 there followed years of a passionate, exclusive liaison between the pair, often all the stormier for the jealousy of both parties.  She inspired his Thaïs (1890) and Le Lys rouge (1894).

Salon
Mme de Caillavet started her own salon  in the hôtel particulier at 12 avenue Hoche, near the Place de l'Étoile.  Sitting in a bergère to the right of the fireplace, with Anatole France standing in front of the fireplace, every Sunday she welcomed the French fashionable, intellectual and political elites, including writers, actors, lawyers and députés (but not musicians, since she and France did not like music).  On Wednesdays, Mme de Caillavet held conversational dinners on the model of those of Mme Aubernon, where could be found Alexandre Dumas, the Hellenist Brochard, Professor Pozzi, Leconte de Lisle, José-Maria de Heredia, Ernest Renan and, of course, Anatole France.

Attendees
Maurice Barrès, Louis Barthou, Tristan Bernard, Sarah Bernhardt, Prince and Princess Bibesco, Léon Blum, the sculptor Antoine Bourdelle, Georg Brandes, Aristide Briand, Georges Clemenceau, Colette and her first husband Henry Gauthier-Villars (known as Willy), Michel Corday, Dr. Paul-Louis Couchoud, François Crucy, Marie and Pierre Curie, Jean-Élie, Duke Decazes, Gugliemo Ferrero, Robert de Flers, the dancer Loïe Fuller, Fernand Gregh, Paul de Grunebaum, the actor Lucien Guitry and his son Sacha Guitry, Gabriel Hanotaux, Jean Jaurès, Léopold Kaher, Jules Lemaitre, Count de Lisle, Pierre Loti, Charles Maurras, Pierre Mille, Robert de Montesquiou, the abbot and astronomer Théophile Moreux, abbé Mugnier, the painter Munkacsy, Anna de Noailles, Hugo Ogetti, Raymond Poincaré, Prof. Samuel-Jean Pozzi, Marcel Prévost, Count Giuseppe Primoli, Marcel Proust, Charles Rappoport, Joseph Reinach, the actress Réjane, Commandant Rivière, J.-H. Rosny the elder, Baron and Baroness Rothschild, Marcel Schwob, and Marcelle Tinayre.

References

Sources
Jeanne Maurice Pouquet, Le Salon de Madame Arman de Caillavet, 1926.
George Painter, Marcel Proust, London, Cratton and Windus, 1959

1844 births
1910 deaths
19th-century French Jews
People of the French Third Republic
French salon-holders
Marcel Proust